The palatine glands form a continuous layer on the posterior surface of the mucous membrane of the soft palate and around the uvula. They are pure mucous glands.

References

External links
 

Glands